"Normal Again" is the 17th episode of season 6 of the television series Buffy the Vampire Slayer. The Futon Critic named it the 35th best episode of 2002.

The Trio summon a demon whose hallucinogenic venom makes Buffy believe that her implausible and nightmarish life as vampire slayer has actually been her own elaborate hallucination as a mental patient, catatonic in a hospital for the past six years.

Production details

According to Joss Whedon, this episode was the "ultimate postmodern look at the concept of a writer writing a show", as it questioned fantastical or inconsistent elements of the show "the way any normal person would". Whedon added that the episode is intentionally left open to interpretation; the actual cause of the delusions, either the poison or Buffy's return to "reality", is not made explicitly clear. "If the viewer wants," Whedon says, "the entire series takes place in the mind of a lunatic locked up somewhere in Los Angeles... and that crazy person is me." Although, "Personally, I think it really happened."

Producer/writer Marti Noxon commented; "It was a fake out; we were having some fun with the audience. I don't want to denigrate what the whole show has meant. If Buffy's not empowered then what are we saying? If Buffy's crazy, then there is no girl power; it's all fantasy. And really the whole show stands for the opposite of that, which is that it isn't just a fantasy. There should be girls that can kick ass. So I'd be really sad if we made that statement at the end. That's why it's just somewhere in the middle saying "Wouldn't this be funny if ...?" or "Wouldn't this be sad or tragic if...?" In my feeling, and I believe in Joss' as well that's not the reality of the show. It was just a tease and a trick".

References

External links

 

Buffy the Vampire Slayer (season 6) episodes
2002 American television episodes
Television episodes set in psychiatric hospitals